The College of Applied Food and Dairy Technology, also known as CAFODAT, is a college in Nepal. The college is located at 134/17, Kumari Marg, Purnachandi, Kumaripati, Lalitpur. Tel: +977 1 5453564, 5438944, 5454543

College of Applied Food and Dairy Technology (CAFODAT) is a preferred destination for the Food Technology, Dairy Technology and Nutrition & Dietetics education in Nepal and is a center for world class education which prepares its graduates to lead in their chosen sector. CAFODAT is offering Diploma in Food and Dairy Technology in affiliation with Council for Technical Education and Vocational Training (CTEVT), Bachelor of Food Technology (B. Tech. Food), Bachelor of Dairy Technology (B. Tech. Dairy) and M. Sc. in Nutrition and Dietetics since 2005 in affiliation with Purbanchal University. CAFODAT is the only college in Nepal that offers Bachelors of Dairy Technology and M. Sc. in Nutrition and Dietetics.

References

External links
CAFODAT.edu.np

Universities and colleges in Nepal